Carlo Borghesio (24 June 1905 – 12 November 1983) was an Italian film director and screenwriter.

Life and career 
Born in Turin,  Borghesio started his career as an assistant director in the second half of the 1930s, notably collaborating with Alessandro Blasetti and Mario Mattoli. After collaborating to a number of screenplays, he made his directorial debut in 1939, co-directing with  Mario Soldati the comedy film Due milioni per un sorriso. Borghesio is best known for his association with Erminio Macario, he directed in a number of critically acclaimed comedies between the 1940s and the early 1950s.

Selected filmography 
 Two Million for a Smile (1939)
 The Sin of Rogelia Sanchez (1940)
 The Champion (1943)
 Two Hearts (1943)
 How I Lost the War (1947)
 L'eroe della strada (1948)
 How I Discovered America (1949)
 Captain Demonio (1950)
 Napoleon (1951)
 Il monello della strada (1951)
 The Angels of the District (1952)
 The Steel Rope (1953)
 The Two Friends (1955)

References

External links 
 

1905 births
1983 deaths
Italian film directors
20th-century Italian screenwriters
Film people from Turin
Italian male screenwriters
20th-century Italian male writers